Proxiphocentron is a genus of caddisflies.

References 

Trichoptera genera